CCGS Sora was a 12.5m Small Multi Task Utility Craft that has seen service with the Canadian Coast Guard and Toronto Fire Services. It was deployed for medium range task and perform under moderate to high speed in moderate weather conditions and in sheltered waters in station mode. In 2005, it was transferred to Toronto and used as part of the Fire Services fleet. It was finally retired in 2015.

Career with Canadian Coast Guard

During her career with the Canadian Coast Guard, Sora was a search and rescue boat along the Detroit River and western Lake Erie.

Her task included:

 towing disabled/grounded light watercraft
 medical evacuation calls
 searching for missing vessels or aircraft over water

The vessel is not ice class and did not operated between December and April.

Transfer to Toronto Fire
She was declared surplus in late 2005 and sold to the Toronto Fire Services in 2006 by the Minister of Fisheries and Oceans. In November 2014, the City of Toronto government acquired another former CCG vessel, which replaced Sora as its second fireboat

See also
Other utility ships in CCG:

References

External links
 Canadian Coast Guard ship adopted by Toronto Fire Service

Ships of the Canadian Coast Guard
Fireboats of Toronto Fire Services
1982 ships
Ships built in Ontario